Eidalimus is a genus of flies in the family Stratiomyidae.

Species
Eidalimus angustifrons James, 1967
Eidalimus annulatus Kertész, 1914
Eidalimus flavicornis Lindner, 1969
Eidalimus fuscus (Kraft & Cook, 1961)
Eidalimus henshawi (Malloch, 1917)
Eidalimus insularum James, 1980
Eidalimus lineatus James, 1980
Eidalimus minutus (Williston, 1901)

References

Stratiomyidae
Brachycera genera
Taxa named by Kálmán Kertész
Diptera of North America
Diptera of South America